Einar Hålien (born 17 November 1963) is a Norwegian editor.

He was born in Fagernes. He was hired as a journalist in the Norwegian Broadcasting Corporation in 1989, and led the district offices of the Broadcasting Corporation in Nordland from 1993 to 1995 and Hordaland from 1995 to 1997. He was appointed chief editor of the large regional newspaper Bergens Tidende in 1997, and became director in Schibsted in 2008.

References

1963 births
Living people
NRK people
Norwegian newspaper editors
Bergens Tidende editors